Omonia Futsal is a professional futsal team based in the city of Nicosia, Cyprus and it is a part of the AC_Omonia. Omonia Futsal is one of the most successful futsal clubs in Cyprus with an overall tally of  5 Championships and 6 Cups.

History
Omonia's futsal team was formed in 2008 as Omonia Futsal, and from the first year at the division won the league title. In 2016, they agreed to merge the club with Ararat for two years.

Current squad
Last Update: 1 September 2021

Notable players

Honours
 Cypriot Championship
 Winners (5): 2008–09, 2010–11, 2011–12, 2012–13, 2018–19

 Cypriot Cup
 Winners (6): 2010–11, 2011–12, 2012–13, 2017–18, 2018-19, 2020-2021

European competitions recordLast update: 4 October 2013''

Matches

References

External links
 AC Omonia – Official Website 

Futsal
Futsal clubs in Cyprus
Futsal clubs established in 2008
2008 establishments in Cyprus